"Money, Money, Money" is a song recorded by Swedish pop group ABBA, written by Benny Andersson and Björn Ulvaeus with Anni-Frid Lyngstad singing lead vocals. It was released on 1 November 1976, as the second single from their fourth album, Arrival (1976). The B-side, "Crazy World", was recorded in 1974 during the sessions for the album ABBA. The song (originally titled "Gypsy Girl") is sung from the viewpoint of a woman who, despite hard work, can barely keep her finances in surplus, and therefore desires a well-off man.

ABBA perform parts of "Money, Money, Money" live in the 1977 film ABBA: The Movie. In the popular musical, Mamma Mia!, the song is sung by the character of Donna as she explains how hard she has to work to keep the taverna in order and her dreams of a better life.

Anni-Frid sings the solo parts.

In the 2008 film, Meryl Streep sings the song.

Reception
Billboard reviewed the single release and described it as a "fast paced" song with "lots of good-natured gimmicks" that is highlighted by its production.  Cash Box said that it "is [ABBA's] cleverest [single] to date, adding humorous lyrics to the distilled pop hooks." Record World said that it "combines Brecht-Weill overtones with a typically sound ABBA pop structure" and that "the ironic lyric goes well with a haunting, music-hall-style tune."

"Money, Money, Money" was the second worldwide hit from Arrival. The song became a number-one chart hit in Australia (ABBA's sixth consecutive chart-topper there), Belgium, France, West Germany, The Netherlands, Mexico and New Zealand, while reaching the top three in Austria, Ireland, Norway, Switzerland and the UK.

By peaking at No. 3 in the UK, "Money, Money, Money" was the only ABBA single between "Mamma Mia" in January 1976 and "Take a Chance on Me" in February 1978 not to top the UK chart. A British poll of "The Nation's Favourite ABBA song" in December 2010 saw "Money, Money, Money" placed at #22 (out of 25). As of September 2021, it is ABBA's 16th-biggest song in the UK, including both pure sales and digital streams.

As of September 1979 in Germany "Money, Money, Money" had sold over 300,000 units. French sales as of April 1977 stand at 500,000.

Music video
The music video for "Money, Money, Money" was inspired by the film Cabaret, showing Frida wearing a hat typical of the 1920s. The video varies from her determined presence in reality during the verses, to the dream sequences about money and "the good life" in the chorus. The video's director, Lasse Hallström, later acknowledged "Money, Money, Money" as the best ABBA video he ever directed.

An alternate music video was filmed for the TV special ABBA-DABBA-DOOO!! featuring Agnetha and Frida in 1920s style flapper dresses, with feathers in their hair.

Personnel
 Anni-Frid Lyngstad – lead vocals
 Agnetha Fältskog - backing vocals
 Anders Glenmark - Guitar
 Björn Ulvaeus – backing vocals
 Benny Andersson – keyboards, synthesizer

Charts

Weekly charts

Year-end charts

Certifications and sales

Cover versions
 The song was covered by The Nolans
 Madness covered the song for the 1999 tribute album/TV programme ABBAmania.
 In 2008, the song is performed by Meryl Streep in the film adaptation of Mamma Mia!, and is included on the soundtrack album.

See also
 List of number-one singles in Australia during the 1970s
 List of Dutch Top 40 number-one singles of 1976
 List of European number-one hits of 1976
 List of number-one hits of 1976 (France)
 List of number-one hits of 1976 (Germany)
 List of number-one singles in 1976 (New Zealand)
 Criticism of capitalism

References

1976 singles
ABBA songs
Dutch Top 40 number-one singles
European Hot 100 Singles number-one singles
Number-one singles in Australia
Number-one singles in Belgium
Number-one singles in Germany
Number-one singles in New Zealand
Polar Music singles
Epic Records singles
Atlantic Records singles
Songs written by Benny Andersson and Björn Ulvaeus
Music videos directed by Lasse Hallström
Madness (band) songs
Song recordings produced by Clive Langer
Song recordings produced by Alan Winstanley